Larona Motlatsi Kgabo (born July 13, 1986) is a Botswana model who won the year 2011 Miss Universe Botswana competition.

Modeling career 
She was born on July 13, 1986, in Gaborone, the capital and largest city of Botswana. Larona Motlatsi Kgabo was voted in the year 2011 Miss Universe Botswana on July 23, 2011, at the Gaborone International Conference Center. Larona Motlatsi Kgabo was chosen among twelve finalists of the competition. Behind her are Jacqueline Sesa and Maungo Gwazai, respectively taking the second and third places in the Miss Universe competition.

At the same time that Larona Motlatsi Kgabo was receiving the Miss Universe competition award, she was also graduation from the university after pursuing a degree in architecture.

Larona Motlatsi Kgabo's victory opened up an opportunity for her to be selected as the official representative of Botswana for the international beauty contest Miss Universe in 2011. She represented her country at the event which was held on September 12, 2011, in São Paulo, Brazil.

References

Botswana female models
1986 births
Living people
People from Gaborone
Miss Universe 2011 contestants